Once Upon a Time... Planet Earth (French: Il était une fois... notre Terre) is a French children's television educational animated series directed by Albert Barillé. It was produced by Procidis and France 3 with the support of the Centre National de la Cinematographie, the Directorate-General for Research of the European Commission and the European Broadcasting Union (EBU). The series was initially broadcast since 22 December 2008 on France 3. This series was the belated finale of the Once Upon a Time... educational television franchise, and its original premise was set up from "Once Upon a Time... the Earth (and Tomorrow?)", the final episode of the first series Once Upon a Time... Man, thus finally going back to the beginning where it all started and ended. The series' premiere also coincided with the 30th anniversary milestone of said educational animation franchise.


Episodes
Planet guards
Climate I: Far North
Water in India
Water in Sahel
Amazon forest
Energies exhaustion
Fair trade
Oceans in danger
Ecosystems
Water of the World
Poverty
Forests of the world
Excessive fishing
Climate II: Origins
Farming
Biodiversity
Climate III: Effects
Recycling
Women of the World
Children's labour
New energies
House and city
Climate IV: Solutions
Children: Health and Education
Technologies
Tomorrow

Voices
Roger Carel : Maestro
Annie Balestra : Pierrette, Psi
Olivier Destrez : Pierrot

Broadcast information

* Contributing co-producer

References

External links

Once upon a Time... Planet Earth at the European Broadcasting Union
Official website for Procidis, the series' producer
 Hello Mastero at YouTube

2008 French television series debuts
2008 French television series endings
2000s French animated television series
French children's animated education television series
Once Upon a Time...
Science education television series